13th Planet Records is an American record label founded by Ministry frontman Al Jourgensen in October 2005. In addition to its function as an artist-run, artist-friendly independent label, 13th Planet encompasses several realms of the music industry including artist management, touring (including 2008's "C U LaTouR"),  music publishing as well as a full-scale rehearsal and recording studio.

The label is a joint venture with Megaforce Records in the United States and Canada and is distributed through Sony BMG Music Entertainment/RED Distribution.

Artists
Ministry
RevCo
Prong
Ascension of the Watchers
Buck Satan and the 666 Shooters
DethRok
False Icons
ReVamp

Releases
Cocked and Loaded (2006) - Revolting Cocks
Rio Grande Blood (2006) - Ministry
Cocktail Mixxx (2007) - Revolting Cocks
Rio Grande Dub (2007) - Ministry
The Last Sucker (2007) - Ministry
Power of the Damager (2007) - Prong
Numinosum (2008) - Ascension of the Watchers
Cover Up (2008) - Ministry & Co-Conspirators
God Complex (2008) - False Icons
The Wicked Soundtrack (2008) - Various artists
Sex-O Olympic-O (2009) - RevCo
Adios... Puta Madres (2009) - Ministry
Power of the Damn Mixxxer (2009) - Prong
The Last Dubber (2009) - Ministry
Sex-O MiXXX-O (2009) - RevCo
It's Always Christmas Time (2009, Single) - Al Jourgensen (with Mark Thwaite)
Got Cock? (2010) - RevCo
Voices in My Head (2010) - Al Jourgensen
MiXXXes of the Molé (2010) - Ministry
Undercover (2010) - Ministry
Bikers Welcome Ladies Drink Free (2011) - Buck Satan and the 666 Shooters
Relapse (2012) - Ministry
From Beer to Eternity (2013) - Ministry
Us & Them (2013) - DethRok

References

American record labels
Record labels established in 2004
Industrial record labels
Heavy metal record labels